Bombs on Monte Carlo is a 1931 German musical comedy film directed by Hanns Schwarz and starring Hans Albers, Anna Sten, and Heinz Rühmann. The film is based on the novel Bomben auf Monte Carlo (1930) by Fritz Reck-Malleczewen. It premiered at the Ufa-Palast am Zoo in August 1931.

The film is known for featuring the German a capella band Comedian Harmonists, who perform the song Das ist die Liebe der Matrosen.

Plot 
Captain Craddock commands the Mediterranean cruiser Persimon, which sails under the flag of the Kingdom of Pontenero. Like his crew, he hasn't received any pay for a long time because the kingdom is bankrupt. Therefore, he refuses to take Queen Yola I on board for a Mediterranean cruise.

Instead, he goes to Monte Carlo to confront the Pontenero consul there. But Yola is already there incognito, who, for lack of money, sacrifices her pearl necklace, for which Craddock finally receives 100,000 francs.

Disguised as a half-world lady, Yola persuades the captain to try his luck at the casino, where Craddock loses all the money after initial winnings. He blames the manager of the casino and threatens his ship to shell him if he doesn't get the money back.

Undetected, Yola follows the angry captain onto his cruiser, who actually has the ship's artillery finished the next day. Panic breaks out in the city and people flee. Then Yola reveals herself as the queen on deck and forbids the shelling. She wants Craddock to be her Secretary of the Navy, and since he is recalcitrant, she has him summarily arrested by the first officer. But Craddock jumps overboard to catch a passing passenger ship. Yola does not give up and gives the order to follow with the cruiser. The outcome remains open, the film ends with sea shanties.

Production
The film was produced by the production unit of Erich Pommer. It was made at the Babelsberg Studios in Berlin and shot on location in Nice. The art director Erich Kettelhut designed the film sets. A separate English-language version Monte Carlo Madness and a French version Le capitaine Craddock were also made as part of UFA's strategy to export its films to other countries. In 1960 the film was remade as Bombs on Monte Carlo.

Cast
Hans Albers as Craddock
Anna Sten as Yola
Heinz Rühmann as Peter Schmidt
Ida Wüst as Isabell
Rachel Devirys as Diane
Kurt Gerron as casino manager
Karl Etlinger as consul
Peter Lorre as Pawlitschek
Otto Wallburg as minister
Charles Kullmann as street singer
Bruno Ziener as jeweler
Comedian Harmonists as sailors

References

External links

1931 musical comedy films
Films based on German novels
Films directed by Hanns Schwarz
Films of the Weimar Republic
Films set in Monaco
Films set in the Mediterranean Sea
German musical comedy films
German multilingual films
Operetta films
Seafaring films
Films shot in France
UFA GmbH films
German black-and-white films
1931 multilingual films
Films shot at Babelsberg Studios
1930s German films